The black roughscale catshark (Apristurus melanoasper) is a catshark of the family Scyliorhinidae. It is recorded from the north Atlantic, eastern South Atlantic, in the Indian Ocean and around Australia and New Zealand. The species can be found on continental shelf at depths between 510 and 1,520 m.

Conservation status 
The New Zealand Department of Conservation has classified the black roughscale catshark as "Data deficient" under the New Zealand Threat Classification System.

References

black roughscale catshark
Fish of the North Atlantic
Taxa named by Samuel Paco Iglésias
Taxa named by Kazuhiro Nakaya
Taxa named by Matthias Stehmann
black roughscale catshark